Le Mentor is a 2013 French film directed by Jean-Pierre Mocky.

Plot
The film portrays a family and follows in particular a young woman on a journey of discovery and love.

Cast
 Jean-Pierre Mocky (Ludovic)
 Solène Hebert (Annette)
 Clovis Fouin (Christian)
 Simon Coutret (Alexandre)
 Marina Monmirel (Caroline)
 Freddy Bournane (Joe "la limace")
 Paméla Ravassard (the lady with the buggy)
 Jean Abeillé (Mr Béchamin)
 Cyrille Dobbels (Huissier)
 Alain Kruger (Banquier)
 Noëlle Leiris (the blonde)
 Fabrice Colson (the big man)
 Gilles Lecoq (the hotel manager)
 Pascal Lagrandeur (the waiter)
 Christian Chauvaud (Claverie)
 Christophe Bier (the clerk)
 Marie-Philomène Nga (Krishna)
 Michel Vaniglia (the tramp who plays the guitar)
 Cédric Tuffier (a tramp)
 Michel Stobac (a young tramp)
 Guillaume Delaunay (the giant in the locker room)
 Catherine Berriane (the lady in the locker room)
 Emmanuel Nakach (the cheesemonger in the supermarket)
 Sarah Bensoussan (the lady in the park)
 Frédéric Buret (the waiter who serves the trout)
 Alain Schlosberg (Fripier)
 David Blanc (the presenter)
 Olivier Defrocourt (inspector C&A)
 Catherine Van Hecke (Gisèle)
 Olivier Hémon (doctor)
 Joelle Hélary (the female dog owner)
 Nathan Agüero (the beggar)
 Jess Liaudin (the barker)
 Jean-Michel Moulhac (the manager at the porch)
 Noël Simsolo (Mr Troublot)
 Patrick Diwen (the guy at the porch)
 Aude Roman (the young woman)
 Dominique Boissel (the advocat)
 Serge Bos (the priest)
 Alain Vettese (Annette's father)
 Michel Fréret-Roy (the jeweller)
 José Exposito (prison guard)
 Martin Delavenne (prison guard)
 Antoine Delelis (the man at the ballon)

Release
The film was released in Paris on 10 April 2013. As of 2014 it is not yet available in the US on DVD or Blu-ray.

See also
 Cinema of France
 List of French language films

References

External links 

2013 films
French comedy films
2010s French-language films
Films directed by Jean-Pierre Mocky
2010s French films